The 2022 Menards 250 was the eighth stock car race of the 2022 ARCA Menards Series season, the fourth race of the 2022 Sioux Chief Showdown, and the seventh iteration of the event. The race was held on Saturday, June 25, 2022, in Elko New Market, Minnesota at Elko Speedway, a 0.375 mile (0.604 km) permanent oval racetrack. The race was contested over 250 laps. Sammy Smith, driving for Kyle Busch Motorsports, dominated the entire race, leading all but 17 laps for his 2nd career ARCA Menards Series win, and his second of the season. To fill out the podium, Jesse Love and Landon Pembelton, both driving for Venturini Motorsports, would finish 2nd and 3rd, respectively.

Background 
Elko Speedway, is a 3/8 mile asphalt oval NASCAR-sanctioned race track located in Elko New Market, Minnesota. Elko Speedway is a track in the NASCAR Advance Auto Parts Weekly Series. The track is located in the former Elko portion of the merged city. The track divisions include Limited Late Models, Thunder Car, Legends, Power Stocks, and Bandoleros on regular Saturday Nights.

Entry list 

 (R) denotes rookie driver

Practice 
The only 45-minute practice session was held on Saturday, June 25, at 3:30 PM CST.

Qualifying 
Qualifying was held on Saturday, June 25, at 5:00 PM CST. The qualifying system used is a single-car, two-lap system with only one round. Whoever sets the fastest time in the round wins the pole.

Race results

Standings after the race 

Drivers' Championship standings

Note: Only the first 10 positions are included for the driver standings.

References

External links 

2022 ARCA Menards Series
NASCAR races at Elko Speedway
Menards 250
2022 in sports in Minnesota